Primocandelabrum is a genus of rangeomorph known from the Avalon-type Ediacaran biota.  It makes up the brunt of some bedding plane assemblages. Primocandelabrum was described by Hofmann, O'Brien, and King in 2008.

Diversity
Fossil specimens of Primocandelabrum from Charnwood Forest:
 Primocandelabrum aelfwynnia Kenchington & Wilby, 2017
 Primocandelabrum boyntoni Kenchington & Wilby, 2017
 Primocandelabrum aethelflaedia Kenchington & Wilby, 2017

Fossil specimens of Primocandelabrum from Bonavista Peninsula:
 Primocandelabrum Hiemaloranum Hofmann, 2008
 Primocandelabrum sp. Hofmann, 2008

Etymology
The fossils are thus named since it resembles candelabra, giving it its signature genus name.

See also
 List of Ediacaran genera

 Hylaecullulus

References

Proterozoic animals
Ediacaran life
Ediacaran Canada
Fossil taxa described in 2008